Crime Counter Crime is a 1936 detective novel by E.C.R. Lorac, the pen name of the British writer Edith Caroline Rivett. It is the ninth in her long-running series featuring Chief Inspector MacDonald of Scotland Yard, a Golden Age detective who relies on standard police procedure to solve his cases. It was her first novel published by Collins Crime Club after switching from Sampson Low, partly on the success of the previous entry in the series The Organ Speaks. Collins then published the remainder the series.

Synopsis
In a Lancashire mining town during the 1935 General Election, a communist agitator is found murdered while on his way to disrupt a speaking engagement by the Conservative Party candidate. Tensions are further raised when a hardline nationalist politician sets his own party followers to investigate the murder.

References

Bibliography
 Cooper, John & Pike, B.A. Artists in Crime: An Illustrated Survey of Crime Fiction First Edition Dustwrappers, 1920-1970. Scolar Press, 1995.
 Hubin, Allen J. Crime Fiction, 1749-1980: A Comprehensive Bibliography. Garland Publishing, 1984.
 Nichols, Victoria & Thompson, Susan. Silk Stalkings: More Women Write of Murder. Scarecrow Press, 1998.
 Reilly, John M. Twentieth Century Crime & Mystery Writers. Springer, 2015.

1936 British novels
British mystery novels
Novels by E.C.R. Lorac
Novels set in England
British detective novels
Collins Crime Club books